The 2008–09 FA Women's Premier League Cup was the 19th edition of the English football cup tournament for teams at both levels of the FA Women's Premier League (level 1, the National Division, and level 2, the Northern and Southern Divisions). The tournament was won by Arsenal, who defeated Doncaster Rovers Belles 5-0.

References

Prem
Doncaster Rovers Belles L.F.C. matches
FA Women's National League Cup